Harry Henri (27 July 1865 – 5 February 1947) was an Australian cricketer. He played one first-class match for Tasmania in 1907.

See also
 List of Tasmanian representative cricketers

References

External links
 

1865 births
1947 deaths
Australian cricketers
Tasmania cricketers
Sportspeople from Tauranga